Daniel John Hardcastle (born 23 March 1989), known online as Nerd³ or NerdCubed, is a British YouTuber and author. Created in 2011, his YouTube channel primarily consists of video game-related content. As of July 2022, it has approximately 2.5 million subscribers and 1.3 billion video views. He is the author of The Sunday Times bestseller Fuck Yeah, Video Games: The Life and Extra Lives of a Professional Nerd.

Career

Online
Hardcastle rose to prominence through a scripted, story-based webcomic created within Minecraft. After creating his YouTube channel on 20 March 2011, Hardcastle initially uploaded a series of comedic vlogs before he uploaded his first let's play. His first let's play series, called Nerd³'s Minecraft Buildy Thing, ran from 27 August 2011 to 22 August 2012. After creating videos on a few indie games, Hardcastle uploaded his first Nerd³ Plays video on 7 January 2012. In 2012, Machinima sponsored him to create the series 13 Ways To Die.

In 2015, Hardcastle was nominated for a Golden Joystick Award for "online personality of the year". He has since amassed more than 2.4 million subscribers and 1.2 billion total views. On Red Nose Day 2019, Hardcastle raised over £16,000 for Comic Relief over the course of an 11-hour livestream. In September 2019, Hardcastle's YouTube account was unverified for being not widely recognised outside the platform.

Film

In 2020, Hardcastle starred in the film Ashens and the Polybius Heist alongside his longtime collaborator Stuart Ashen, who also co-wrote the film.  Hardcastle himself also holds a small writing credit for the film, having written two jokes into it when Ashen gave him the script.

Books
Hardcastle began writing his first book, Fuck Yeah, Video Games: The Life & Extra Lives of a Professional Nerd, in 2017. On 4 June 2018, he started crowdfunding the book through the website Unbound. The book reached 100% of its target on the first day and 1000% by 11 June. Reaching a total of 1903% of its initial goal, the book is the most successful crowdfunded book in the United Kingdom. The foreword of the book was written by founder of Double Fine and game director Tim Schafer, and another a chapter was contributed by YouTuber Stuart Ashen. The book was released on 19 September 2019 and was a The Sunday Times best seller.

On 26 September 2019, crowdfunding began for Hardcastle's second book, The Paradox Paradox, a science fiction novel which he described as "a bit Star Trek, a bit Doctor Who, and a bit fucked up." The book achieved its funding goal within 20 minutes.

Personal life
Hardcastle is married to Rebecca Maughan, an artist who illustrated Fuck Yeah, Video Games.

Hardcastle's father, Steve "Dad³" Hardcastle, with whom he has regularly collaborated, started a YouTube channel in 2013; it has accumulated more than 300,000 subscribers and 23 million total views.

Hardcastle studied astrophysics at the University of Leicester, but dropped out after the first year.

References

External links 
Nerdcubed official website
Daniel Hardcastle at the Internet Movie Database

1989 births
Comedy YouTubers
English humorists
English webcomic creators
English writers
English YouTubers
Gaming YouTubers
Living people
Patreon creators
People from Essex
People from Southend-on-Sea